is a museum in Magome-juku, Nakatsugawa, Gifu Prefecture, Japan dedicated to the life and works of Shimazaki Tōson. The writer was born in the former Honjin in 1872, but his birthplace and childhood home was mostly destroyed in the conflagration of 1895. Rebuilt to designs by Taniguchi Yoshirō in 1947, the museum opened in 1952. The core of the collection comprises some 5,000 items donated by Shimazaki Tōson's eldest son.

See also
 List of Historic Sites of Japan (Gifu)
 Kiso Valley
 Nakasendō
 Before the Dawn

References

External links

 Tōson Memorial Museum

Nakatsugawa, Gifu
Museums in Gifu Prefecture
Biographical museums in Japan
Literary museums in Japan
Museums established in 1952
1952 establishments in Japan